The Japanese national ice hockey team ( Aisuhokkē Danshi Nippon Daihyō) is the national men's ice hockey of Japan. They are controlled by the Japan Ice Hockey Federation and a member of the International Ice Hockey Federation (IIHF). Japan is currently ranked 23rd in the rankings and currently compete in the IIHF World Championship Division I. They have competed in eight Olympic Games competitions.

Tournament participation

Winter Olympics
1936 – 9th place (tied)
1960 – 8th place
1964 – 11th place
1968 – 10th place
1972 – 9th place
1976 – 9th place
1980 – 12th place
1998 – 13th place

World Championship
1930 – Finished tied in 6th place
1957 – Finished in 8th place
1962 – Finished in 9th place (1st in "Pool B")
1967 – Finished in 17th place (1st in "Pool C")
1969 – Finished in 15th place (1st in "Pool C")
1970 – Finished in 11th place (5th in "Pool B")
1971 – Finished in 12th place (6th in "Pool B")
1972 – Finished in 11th place (5th in "Pool B")
1973 – Finished in 12th place (6th in "Pool B")
1974 – Finished in 10th place (4th in "Pool B")
1975 – Finished in 12th place (6th in "Pool B")
1976 – Finished in 10th place (2nd in "Pool B")
1977 – Finished in 11th place (3rd in "Pool B")
1978 – Finished in 10th place (2nd in "Pool B")
1979 – Finished in 14th place (6th in "Pool B")
1981 – Finished in 16th place (8th in "Pool B")
1982 – Finished in 17th place (1st in "Pool C")
1983 – Finished in 13th place (5th in "Pool B")
1985 – Finished in 13th place (5th in "Pool B")
1986 – Finished in 15th place (8th in "Pool B")
1987 – Finished in 17th place (1st in "Pool C")
1989 – Finished in 15th place (7th in "Pool B")
1990 – Finished in 15th place (7th in "Pool B")
1991 – Finished in 16th place (8th in "Pool B")
1992 – Finished in 15th place (3rd in "Pool B")
1993 – Finished in 17th place (5th in "Pool B")
1994 – Finished in 16th place (4th in "Pool B")
1995 – Finished in 18th place (6th in "Pool B")
1996 – Finished in 20th place (8th in "Pool B")
1997 – Finished in 24th place (4th in "Pool C")
1998 – Finished in 14th place
1999 – Finished in 16th place
2000 – Finished in 16th place
2001 – Finished in 16th place
2002 – Finished in 16th place
2003 – Finished in 16th place
2004 – Finished in 15th place
2005 – Finished in 24th place (4th in Division I, Group A)
2006 – Finished in 22nd place (3rd in Division I, Group A)
2007 – Finished in 22nd place (3rd in Division I, Group B)
2008 – Finished in 21st place (3rd in Division I, Group B)
2009 – Finished in 21st place (3rd in Division I, Group A)
2010 – Finished in 21st place (3rd in Division I, Group A)
2011 – Withdrew from tournament citing the 2011 Tōhoku earthquake; remained in Group A
2012 – Finished in 20th place (4th in Division I, Group A)
2013 – Finished in 20th place (4th in Division I, Group A)
2014 – Finished in 19th place (3rd in Division I, Group A)
2015 – Finished in 20th place (4th in Division I, Group A)
2016 – Finished in 22nd place (6th in Division I, Group A)
2017 – Finished in 24th place (2nd in Division I, Group B)
2018 – Finished in 24th place (2nd in Division I, Group B)
2019 – Finished in 25th place (3rd in Division I, Group B)
2020 – Cancelled due to the COVID-19 pandemic
2021 – Cancelled due to the COVID-19 pandemic
2022 – Finished in 22nd place (2nd in Division I, Group B)

Asian Winter Games
1986 – Finished in 2nd place
1990 – Finished in 2nd place
1996 – Finished in 2nd place
1999 – Finished in 2nd place
2003 – Finished in 1st place
2007 – Finished in 1st place
2011 – Finished in 2nd place
2017 – Finished in 3rd place

Team

Notable coaches
1962, Tsutomu Kawabuchi
2022,  Perry Pearn

All-time record against other nations
As of 12 November 2017

All-time record against other teams
As of 27 August 2016

See also
All Japan Ice hockey Championship
Japan men's national junior ice hockey team
Japan men's national under-18 ice hockey team
Japan women's national ice hockey team

References

External links

IIHF profile
National Teams of Ice Hockey

Ice hockey teams in Japan
National ice hockey teams in Asia
Ice hockey